Ukrainian voice may refer to these Ukrainian newspapers.

 Ukrainian voice, West Ukrainian People's Republic
 Ukrainian voice, Winnipeg
 Ukrainian voice, Kirovohrad
 Ukrainian voice, Lutsk
 Ukrainian voice, Peremyshl